Matthew Charles Mullenweg (born January 11, 1984) is an American entrepreneur and web developer living in Houston. He is known for developing and founding the free and open-source web software WordPress, and its parent company Automattic.

After dropping out of the University of Houston, he worked at CNET Networks from 2004 to 2006 until he quit and founded Automattic, an internet company whose brands include WordPress.com, Akismet, Gravatar, VaultPress, IntenseDebate, Crowdsignal, and Tumblr.

Early life and education
Mullenweg was born in Houston, Texas, and attended the High School for the Performing and Visual Arts where he studied jazz saxophone. He studied at the University of Houston, majoring in political science, before he dropped out in 2004 to pursue a job at CNET Networks. Mullenweg was raised Catholic.

Career

In January 2003, Mullenweg and Mike Little started WordPress as a fork of b2. They were soon joined by original b2 developer Michel Valdrighi. Mullenweg was 19 years old, and a freshman at the University of Houston at the time. In March 2004, he co-founded the Global Multimedia Protocols Group (GMPG) with Eric Meyer and Tantek Çelik. GMPG wrote the first of the Microformats. In April 2004, with fellow WordPress developers, they launched Ping-O-Matic, a hub for notifying or "pinging" blog search engines, like Technorati, about blog updates. The following month, WordPress competitor Movable Type announced a radical price change, driving thousands of users to seek another blogging platform; this is widely seen as the tipping point in WordPress's popularity.

In October 2004, he was recruited by CNET to work on WordPress for them and help them with blogs and new media offerings. He dropped out of college and moved to San Francisco from Houston, Texas, the following month. Mullenweg announced bbPress in December, Mullenweg and the WordPress team released WordPress 1.5 "Strayhorn" in February 2005, which had over 900,000 downloads. The release introduced their theme system, moderation features, and a redesign of the front and back end. In late March and early April, Andrew Baio found at least 168,000 hidden articles on the WordPress.org website that were using a technique known as cloaking. Mullenweg admitted accepting the questionable advertisement and removed all articles from the domain.

Mullenweg left CNET in October 2005 to focus on WordPress and related activities full-time, and announced Akismet several days later. Akismet is a distributed effort to stop comment and trackback spam by using the collective input of everyone using the service. In December, he announced Automattic, the company behind WordPress.com and Akismet. Automattic employed people who had contributed to the WordPress project, including lead developer Ryan Boren and WordPress MU creator Donncha Ó Caoimh. An Akismet licensing deal and WordPress bundling was announced with Yahoo! Small Business web hosting about the same time.

In January 2006, Mullenweg recruited former Oddpost CEO and Yahoo! executive Toni Schneider to join Automattic as CEO, bringing the size of the company to 5. An April 2007 Regulation D filing showed that Automattic raised approximately $1.1 million. Investors were Polaris Ventures, True Ventures, Radar Partners, and CNET.

Mullenweg runs an angel investment firm Audrey Capital, which has backed nearly 30 companies since 2008. In 2011 he backed Y Combinator startup Earbits.

In January 2008, Automattic raised an additional $29.5 million for the company from Polaris Venture Partners, True Ventures, Radar Partners, and the New York Times Company. According to Mullenweg's blog the funding was a result of spurned acquisition offers months before and the decision to keep the company independent. At the time the company had 18 employees. One of the reported plans for the funding was in a forum service called TalkPress.

In January 2009, the San Francisco Business Times reported that traffic to WordPress sites were growing faster than for Google's blogger service and significantly outstripped its nearest competitor, Six Apart. A reporter at eMarketer called Mullenweg "quite an entrepreneur and visionary" and compared WordPress' momentum over its competitors to Facebook's growing popularity over MySpace.

In February 2009, an interview with Power Magazine called Mullenweg "the Blog Prince" and dispelled the myth that blogging was a passing trend and revealed that the company has seen a 10% month-on-month organic growth with more than 15,000 new blogs hosted by WordPress each day.

In May 2009, Mullenweg's unwillingness to comply with Chinese censorship meant WordPress.com was effectively blocked by China's Golden Shield Project.

A Bloomberg interview in April 2011 described the impressive scalability of the company. Monthly infrastructure costs were only $300,000 to $400,000 while powering 12% of the internet with 1,350 servers and 80 employees in 62 cities. The management of the global company excludes all internal email but instead communication is rooted in their P2theme.com blog theme.

In July 2011, WordPress blogs pass the 50 million milestone, powering over 50 million blogs globally.

In April 2012, Pingdom reported that "WordPress completely dominates top 100 blog" and is in use by 49% of the top 100 blogs in the world. This is a huge increase from the 32% that was recorded 3 years ago. In May 2012, All Things D reported that "WordPress now powers 70 million sites... and expects to bring in $45 million in revenue this year." The company has a very low rate of staff attrition: 106 employees whilst has only ever hired 118.

In January 2014 Mullenweg became CEO of Automattic. Toni Schneider moved to work on new projects at Automattic. In the announcement Mullenweg joked "it's obvious that no one in their twenties should run a company.", and a few months later in May raised $160 million in additional funding for the company, valuing the company at over a billion dollars, and WordPress was cited as powering "22 percent of the world's top 10 million websites."

Since 2005, Mullenweg has been a frequent keynote/speaker at conferences/events, including global WordCamp events, SxSW, Web 2.0 Summit, YCombinator's Startup School, Le Web, Lean Startup Conference, and the International World Wide Web Conference etc.

From 2017 to 2019, Mullenweg also served as a board member for GitLab, Inc.

Awards and recognition
In March 2007, Mullenweg was named #16 of the 50 most important people on the web by PC World, reportedly the youngest on the list. In October, Mullenweg acquired the Gravatar service and was rumored to have turned down a US$200 million offer to buy his company Automattic. In 2008, Mullenweg received the Information Technology Innovator Award – presented by Temple University's Fox School of Business and Management to those who have applied Information Technology to create new business opportunities.

In July 2008, Mullenweg was featured on the cover of Linux Journal. Later that month a San Francisco Chronicle story put him on the cover of the business section and noted he still drove a Chevrolet Lumina and WordPress.com was ranked #31 on Alexa with 90 million monthly page views. In September, Mullenweg was being named to the Top 30 Entrepreneurs Under 30 by Inc. Magazine and one of the 25 Most Influential People on the Web by BusinessWeek.

In December 2010, Mullenweg was awarded the Winner of the TechFellow Award in "Product Design and Marketing". In January 2011, Business Insider listed Mullenweg as #3 of their 30 Founders under 30 list for creating WordPress, the power behind many new startups.

In March 2011, Mullenweg was named one of the top 10 most influential people online for changing the face of the internet by Business Insider. In October 2011, Mullenweg made Vanity Fair'''s Next Establishment prestigious list of rising talents in tech, media, policy, and business. In December 2011, Mullenweg was listed in Forbes 30 Under 30 for Social/Mobile for the impact he has made on the blogging world through open source.

In May 2012, Mullenweg was listed in Forbes Most Influential Angel Investors on AngelList. In December 2012, Mullenweg was listed in 2012 Forbes's 30 Under 30 in Media and received the 21st Annual Heinz Awards in Technology, Employment and the Economy in 2016. 

Mullenweg has a chapter giving advice in Tim Ferriss' book Tools of Titans.

Notable life accomplishments
Mullenweg is a Dvorak Keyboard user and can type over 120 wpm. He is on the board of Grist.org, the founder/director of the WordPress Foundation, and is the only non-company high level sponsor of the Apache Software Foundation.

Mullenweg supports a number of philanthropic organizations including Archive.org, Electronic Frontier Foundation, Free Software Foundation, Long Now, and Innocence Project. He is also a member of The Well at the non-profit "Charity: Water" organization (with which he traveled to Ethiopia in February 2012) where he supports providing clean and safe drinking water to people in developing nations. For his 28th birthday he started a campaign which raised over $28,000 for the cause, and then over $44,000 for his 30th. Mullenweg was a major supporter of The Bay Lights'' project, both as the first donor and later helping to finish the project with a second $1.5 million donation.

See also
Browse Happy

References

External links 

 

1984 births
American jazz saxophonists
Free software programmers
Computer programmers
Web developers
Living people
Social entrepreneurs
Web development
High School for the Performing and Visual Arts alumni
Henry Crown Fellows
WordPress